Mylavaram is a town in NTR district of the Indian state of Andhra Pradesh. It is located in Mylavaram mandal of Vijayawada revenue division. Mylavaram village has higher literacy rate compared to Andhra Pradesh.In 2011, literacy rate of Mylavaram village was 76.49% compared to 67.02% of Andhra Pradesh. 

Mylavaram mandal is one of the border mandals to Telangana State. The National Highway NH-30 (Previously known as NH-221) passing through the town.The main colonies in mylavaram town are Tarakarama Nagar (Devuni Cheruvu),Bandhagar, Ramakrishna Colony, Balayogi Nagar, Santhi Nagar, NSP Colony, Chandra Babu Nagar, Old town and Pura Gutta Colony.

Geography

It has an average elevation of 47 metres (157 feet).

Economy 

Agriculture produce includes Banginapalli, Totapuri and other varieties of mangoes in the abundant Mango orchards of Mylavaram. These are exported to cities namely Dubai, Hongkong, London and Singapore.

Assembly constituency

Mylavaram falls in Mylavaram (Assembly constituency) is an assembly constituency of Andhra Pradesh Legislative Assembly. Vasantha Venkata  is the present MLA of YSRCP.

Education 

Mylavaram has Lakireddy Bali Reddy College of Engineering(LBRCE). It also has Lakiredyy Hanimi Reddy Government Degree College and Vemuluri Venkata Ratnam Government Junior College.

See also 

Villages in Mylavaram mandal

References

Mandal headquarters in NTR district
Cities and towns in NTR district